The Tahiti monarch (Pomarea nigra), or Tahiti flycatcher, is a rare species of bird in the monarch flycatcher family. It is endemic to Tahiti in French Polynesia. There are between 25 and 100 individuals remaining with an increasing population trend.

Taxonomy and systematics
The Tahiti monarch was originally described in the genus Muscicapa. Formerly, the Maupiti monarch was considered as a subspecies of the Tahiti monarch until re-classified as separate species in 2012.

Description
This bird is 15 centimeters long and black in color with a pale blue bill. The juvenile is reddish brown. The call sounds like tick-tick-tick and the song is "flute-like".

Distribution and habitat
This bird is found in only four valleys in Tahiti. It lives in the canopy and understory in forests among mara trees (Neonauclea forsteri).

Threats
Threats to the species include the degradation of its forest habitat by the invasion of exotic plant species, including Miconia calvescens and Spathodea campanulata. The forest is also degraded by goat activity. Predation by rats and cats is a threat. The Tahiti kingfisher (Todiramphus veneratus) is a competitor.

References

Pomarea
Endemic birds of Tahiti
Birds described in 1786
Taxonomy articles created by Polbot